Ratf**ked: The True Story Behind the Secret Plan to Steal America's Democracy is a 2016 book by David Daley that discusses efforts by some Republican political operatives, including Karl Rove, Ed Gillespie and Chris Jankowski, to exploit redistricting processes around the United States in order to gain greater control of the American Congress, under a project called REDMAP. Daley describes the effects on six states: Pennsylvania, North Carolina, Michigan, Ohio, Florida and Wisconsin. Daley was the editor-in-chief of the online publication Salon.

Reception 

Ratf**ked received largely positive reviews. Alex Wagner of The New York Times called it "disheartening and enraging in equal measure — and also occasionally dull"; Elizabeth Kolbert of The New Yorker called it "compelling"; Elizabeth Drew of The New York Review of Books called it "sobering and convincing"; and Julian E. Zelizer of The Washington Post described it as an "eye-opening tour of a process that many Americans never see" but also called it "punchy, though overstated."

See also
 Gill v. Whitford
 Slay the Dragon (2019 documentary)

References

2016 non-fiction books
American political books
Gerrymandering in the United States
Boni & Liveright books